Richard Wilde Walker Jr. (March 11, 1857 – April 10, 1936) was an associate justice of the Alabama Supreme Court and a United States circuit judge of the United States Court of Appeals for the Fifth Circuit.

Education and career

Born on March 11, 1857, in Florence, Alabama, Walker attended Washington and Lee University and then received an Artium Baccalaureus degree in 1877 from the College of New Jersey (now Princeton University). He attended Columbia Law School and then read law in 1878. He entered private practice in St. Louis, Missouri; Albuquerque, New Mexico Territory; New York City; and Huntsville, Alabama. He was a justice of the Supreme Court of Alabama from 1891 to 1892. He was a member of the Alabama House of Representatives in 1903. He was the Presiding Judge of the Court of Appeals of Alabama from 1911 to 1914.

Federal judicial service

Walker was nominated by President Woodrow Wilson on October 2, 1914, to a seat on the United States Court of Appeals for the Fifth Circuit vacated by Judge David Davie Shelby. He was confirmed by the United States Senate on October 5, 1914, and received his commission the same day. He was a member of the Conference of Senior Circuit Judges (now the Judicial Conference of the United States) from 1922 to 1929. He assumed senior status on September 1, 1930. His service terminated on April 10, 1936, due to his death.

Personal

Walker was the son of Richard Wilde Walker. He was the grandson of John Williams Walker and nephew of LeRoy Pope Walker and Percy Walker.

References

Sources
 
 "Memorial Record of Alabama: A Concise Account of the State's Political, Military, Professional and Industrial Progress, Together With the Personal Memoirs of Many of Its People," Volume 2, published by Brant & Fuller in Madison, WI (1893), pp. 765–766.
 U. S. Census Records 1860–1930.

1857 births
1936 deaths
Politicians from Huntsville, Alabama
Columbia Law School alumni
Justices of the Supreme Court of Alabama
Judges of the United States Court of Appeals for the Fifth Circuit
United States court of appeals judges appointed by Woodrow Wilson
20th-century American judges
Walker family
Lawyers from Huntsville, Alabama